I Love You (stylized as I Love You.) is the debut studio album by American indie pop band the Neighbourhood, which was released worldwide on April 22, 2013.

Background
The tracks on this album expresses a series of angst-ridden themes based on both the vibe and lyrical content of the songs. Bryan Sammis explained to Coup De Main magazine: "I think that at least in terms of the musical aspect of it, all of us try and get our own emotions out through our instruments, which is not always the easiest thing to do. I think for Jesse Rutherford lyrically, what I really like about him and about us as a band is that a lot of his lyrics aren't necessarily pre-ordained, because he's not trying to force it. A lot of his lyrics are off the top of his head when he first hears the song, because that makes it more natural, it's legitimately what he is thinking about and how he is feeling when he hears that song."

Critical reception

Reception to I Love You was mixed. At Metacritic, which assigns a normalized rating out of 100 to reviews from mainstream critics, the album received an average score of 48, based on 8 reviews. Los Angeles Times critic Mikael Wood wrote that despite the band's mastery of the "textural know-how" of contemporary alternative rock, their songs mostly "stretch out into dreary electro-goth atmospherics" and "lack any kind of urgency". AllMusic editor Tim Sendra found that the album's music rarely deviates from its "ponderous nature", ultimately "leaving the listener with an overall experience that is oppressively grey and joyless". Kat Rolle of Drowned in Sound deemed its lyrics to be "inane" and thematically limited to "California and sex", while panning the band's musical approach as unoriginal and calculated for mass appeal.

In a positive review, Jamie Milton of DIY wrote that the Neighbourhood "stick to the remarkably fully formed mantra they arrived on the scene chanting", concluding that I Love You "achieves what few debuts can, by making one hell of an opening statement". Caroline Sullivan of The Guardian was critical of the album's "petulant" lyrics, which she remarked were "obviously aimed at teenagers", but concluded that its "dreamy melancholy and high-shine production" and "traditional songcraft" may nonetheless appeal to a broader audience. Irish Times critic Jim Carroll remarked that the band's hooky pop songs, such as "Sweather Weather" and "Female Robbery", can be "ravishing", but felt that the album is weighed down by occasional "fillers".

The album track list appears to have undertaken some edits prior to being released publicly, as Kat Rolle commented on the "late-stage change up" of "How", which appears as the album's opening track.

Track listing

Personnel
The Neighbourhood
Zach Abels – lead guitar
Jeremy Freedman – rhythm guitar
Mikey Margott – bass guitar
Jesse Rutherford – vocals
Bryan Sammis – drums, percussion

Technical personnel
Emile Haynie – producer
Tony Mantz – mastering
Chris Mullings – engineering
Justyn Pilbrow – production
Craig Silvey – mixing

Charts

Weekly charts

Year-end charts

Certifications

References

2013 debut albums
Columbia Records albums
The Neighbourhood albums
Albums produced by Emile Haynie